Ellsworth is an unincorporated community in central Ellsworth Township, Mahoning County, Ohio, United States. It is part of the Youngstown–Warren metropolitan area. It lies at the intersection of U.S. Route 224 and State Route 45, and has a post office with the ZIP code 44416.

History
The community has the name of Oliver Ellsworth, a Connecticut politician and local landowner.  A variant name was Ellsworth Center. A post office was established at Ellsworth in 1819. Besides the post office, Ellsworth Center had a sawmill and a station on the Pennsylvania Railroad.

References

Unincorporated communities in Mahoning County, Ohio
1819 establishments in Ohio
Populated places established in 1819
Unincorporated communities in Ohio